Cychrus pangi is a species of ground beetle in the subfamily of Carabinae. It was described by Deuve & Tian in 2004.

Etymology
Uncertain, possibly from Cychreus, son of Poseidon and Salamis, or from Cychros, a city in Thrace near a lake whose water was unhealthy. Duméril (1823: 167) stated that Cychros was the name of a bird (probably in Pliny the Elder), but this hasn't been proven.

References

pangi
Beetles described in 2004